Carlos David Alvarez (Lugo) (born November 25, 1985) was a shortstop for the Washington Nationals organization. He was known as Esmailyn Gonzalez until February 2009, when Sports Illustrated published an investigation that proved he had used fraudulent documents to convince the Nationals that he was several years younger than his true age.

Signing 
On July 2, 2006, the Nationals signed Alvarez, then known as Esmailyn Gonzalez, as an international free agent. He was given a $1.4 million signing bonus. The Nationals were given information that Alvarez was born on September 21, 1989, a date which the MLB office confirmed for at least three interested teams, including Washington. He made his debut for the Gulf Coast League Nationals in 2007.

Name/birth date controversy 
Soon after the player was signed by the Nationals, team officials asked MLB to do some further checking in response to concerns about irregularities in his signing. MLB initially determined there was nothing out of the ordinary. 

However, on February 17, 2009, Sports Illustrated uncovered evidence that Gonzalez's real name was Carlos Alvarez Lugo, and he was born in 1985 rather than 1989. Even before then, a number of baseball insiders suspected that Gonzalez/Lugo was significantly less than advertised. One of them told SI that despite the Nationals billing him as a five-tool player, "he doesn't run all that well, and has an average arm."

In a press conference later that day, Nationals president Stan Kasten confirmed that Gonzalez's real name was indeed Carlos Alvarez Lugo. A visibly angry Kasten said the Nationals had been victimized by "a deliberate, premeditated fraud" involving several people and a raft of falsified records. He added that he'd asked for a further inquiry in response to revelations that Chicago White Sox officials were skimming off the signing bonuses of Latino prospects. He vowed the Nationals would seek legal and financial recourse.

The Federal Bureau of Investigation soon began investigating Nationals general manager Jim Bowden, suspecting that he has skimmed bonus money from international signees since 1994, when he was with the Cincinnati Reds. Bowden was subsequently forced to resign as a result of the affair. Nothing ever came of that investigation.

With the news of Lugo's real name and age, he was far less valuable as a player. Although he won the Gulf Coast League batting title in 2008 and compiled fairly good numbers in runs, RBIs and hits, one scout said that these numbers were to be expected considering that he was somewhat older than his competition.

Despite the fraud, Lugo continued to play in the Nationals minor league system through 2013. However, he never rose higher than Class A. He played for Tigres del Licey in the Dominican Professional Baseball League in 2014-15, and has not returned to baseball at any level since then.

References

External links 

Carlos Alvarez/Esmailyn Gonzalez's statistics at Baseball-Reference
Sports Illustrated report about controversy
Minor league stats

1985 births
Living people
Minor league baseball players
Gulf Coast Nationals players
Auburn Doubledays players
Hagerstown Suns players